Tang Sanzang is a central character in the 16th century novel Journey to the West by Wu Cheng'en. Tang Sanzang is based on the historical Buddhist monk Xuanzang. He is also widely known by his courtesy name, Tang Seng, or Sanzang.

The title Sanzang refers to his mission to seek the Sanzangjing, or the "Three Collections of (Buddhist) Scriptures". In some English translations of Journey to the West, the title is rendered as Tripitaka which is the original Sanskrit term for the Sanzangjing. His name Tang Sanzang reflects his status as an oath brother of Emperor Taizong of the Tang dynasty.

Character description
In the novel, Tang Sanzang is a Chinese Buddhist monk who is actually a reincarnation of Golden Cicada, a disciple of the Buddha.

Tang Sanzang is originally the posthumous son of Tang Palace Graduate Chen Guangrui and the Prime Minister's daughter, Yin Wenjiao. After being awarded the first place in a national examination, Chen Guangrui is appointed Prefect of Jiangzhou (modern Jiujiang). While on his way to take office, he is murdered by a ferryman named Liu Hong, who also abducts his wife and takes his place as Prefect. When Chen's son is born, Yin Wenjiao puts the baby on a wooden board and sets him floating adrift down the Yangzi River, out of fear of him being killed by Liu Hong. The baby reaches a monastery and is found by the Abbot, who names him Xuanzang and raises him as a Buddhist novice. When Xuanzang turns 18, he is reunited with his father, whose body was saved by the Dragon King of River Hong; together they look for Yin Wenjiao and bring Liu Hong to justice.

He is sent by the Emperor Taizong on a mission to Tianzhu (an ancient Chinese name for India) to fetch a set of Buddhist scriptures back to China for the purpose of spreading Buddhism in his native land. He becomes sworn brothers with the Emperor of the Tang dynasty, and the emperor sees him off from the capital Chang'an with two escorts to accompany him.

Tang Sanzang is helpless at defending himself and his two escorts are killed during his first encounter with demons after his departure from Chang'an. The bodhisattva Avalokiteśvara (Guanyin) helps Tang Sanzang find three powerful supernatural beings – Sun Wukong, Zhu Bajie and Sha Wujing (a monkey, pig and fish spirit respectively) – to aid and protect him on his journey. The three become Tang Sanzang's disciples and receive enlightenment and redemption for their past sins once the pilgrimage is complete.

Along the journey, Tang Sanzang is constantly terrorised by monsters and demons due to a legend which says that one can attain immortality by consuming his flesh because he is a reincarnation of a holy being. One of his disciples is caught by a monster, and the other falls into the Tongtian River, also known as the River of Communion with Heaven.

At the end of the novel, Tang Sanzang is appointed as the Buddha of Sandalwood Merit.

Historical background
Tang Sanzang is modeled after the historical Tang dynasty Buddhist monk Xuanzang, whose life was the book's inspiration; the real Xuanzang made a perilous journey on foot from China to India (and back) to obtain Buddhist sutras.

In contrast to the historical Xuanzang, a wise and learned scholar (he was in his late 20s when he left for India), the fictional Tang Sanzang is presented as a young monk who is extremely naive, showing idealistic compassion without wisdom. Tang Sanzang is usually quick to fall for the facades of demons who have disguised themselves as innocent humans, as he cannot recognize them, whereas Sun Wukong can. This frequently leads to tension when Sun Wukong tries to protect him from such threats. One such popular instance was when the White Bone Demon (白骨夫人, Chinese: Bai Gu Fu Ren) disguised three times as family members — first, a young woman. After Wukong "killed" the woman, the demon escaped, but Wukong was punished by Tang Sanzang for it. The second was the young woman's elderly mother, looking for her daughter. The third was the young woman's elderly father, searching for his wife and child. Upon the "death" of the father by Wukong's hands, Wukong finally killed the demon before she got away. Tang Sanzang, convinced that Wukong had actually killed three innocent people, sent him away, despite protests. Tang Sanzang usually punishes him by chanting the words of the headache spell (緊箍咒) given to Tang Sanzang by the bodhisattva Avalokiteśvara (Guanyin) to control Wukong, which causes the latter's headband to contract and give him acute headaches.

Like Sun Wukong, Tang Sanzang is often described as a god of protection. Ksitigarbha, a highly revered bodhisattva in East Asian Buddhism, is occasionally mistaken for Tang Sanzang because the former is often portrayed like Tang Sanzang - dressed in a similarly patterned kasaya robe, wearing a Buddhist crown (an Ushnisha or a Black Crown), and wielding a khakkhara staff. In some depictions or media sometimes Sanzang is depicted as a female monk or nun but this is mostly in Japan.

Gallery

References

Further reading 

Original text

See also 

 Monkey King
 Journey to the West

Chinese Buddhist monks
Journey to the West characters
Fictional Chinese people in literature
Fictional characters based on real people
Fictional Buddhist monks
Fictional Tang dynasty people